East Farnham is a municipality located in the province of Quebec, Canada. It is part of Brome-Missisquoi Regional County Municipality, in the administrative region of Estrie. The population as of the 2021 Canadian Census was 612.

Demographics

Population
Population trend:

Language
Mother tongue language (2021)

See also
List of municipalities in Quebec

References

Municipalities in Quebec
Incorporated places in Brome-Missisquoi Regional County Municipality